Harry Ostrer is a medical geneticist who investigates the genetic basis of common and rare disorders. In the diagnostic laboratory, he translates the findings of genetic discoveries into tests that can be used to identify people's risks for disease prior to  occurrence, or for predicting its outcome once it has occurred. He is also known for his study, writing and lectures on the origins of the Jewish people.

He is a Professor of Pathology and Genetics at Albert Einstein College of Medicine of Yeshiva University and Director of Genetic and Genomic Testing at Montefiore Medical Center.

For the prior 21 years he was Professor of Pediatrics, Pathology and Medicine and Director of the Human Genetics Program at New York University School of Medicine.

Education
Ostrer graduated in 1972 from the Massachusetts Institute of Technology (Physics, Course 8). As an undergraduate student, he worked in the laboratory of Salvador Luria, studying the effects of the bactericidal agent Colicin K. He received his M.D. degree from the Columbia University College of Physicians and Surgeons in 1976.

While at Columbia, he established a community-based genetic screening program that was a pivotal influence on his subsequent career choice of medical genetics. He trained in pediatrics and medical genetics at Johns Hopkins University and in molecular genetics at the National Institutes of Health (NIH).

While at NIH, he worked in the laboratory of Joram Piatigorsky to understand the molecular biology of crystallins in the developing lens. Prior to his position at NYU, Ostrer was a research associate of the Howard Hughes Medical Institute at Johns Hopkins University and a faculty member at the University of Florida College of Medicine in Gainesville, Florida.

Research
Ostrer has investigated the genetic basis of rare disorders, including thalassemias, color vision deficiencies, hereditary sensory neuropathies, disorders of sex development and newly identified genetic syndromes.

While working at the Khao I Dang Holding Center in Thailand in 1981, he recruited Thai and Khmer subjects for a study of the shared origin of the Hemoglobin E mutation. He and his collaborators subsequently showed that this mutation altered the splicing of the encoded globin transcript, resulting in a mild thalassemia phenotype. At NYU, members of his laboratory showed that genetic variants in the X-cone opsin caused color vision deficiencies by altering spectral tuning, transport, and stability of the encoded visual pigment proteins.

In a 2001 article in Nature Reviews Genetics, he noted the curious over-representation of lysosomal storage diseases, disorders of DNA repair, clotting disorders, and metabolic disorders in Jewish diaspora groups, suggesting a possible commonality for selection of heterozygotes for each of these classes of disorders. In the book Legacy: A Genetic History of the Jewish People, Ostrer explored how these genetic observations might influence collective Jewish identity as well as be used to create a personalized genomics for Jewish people.

He co-founded The Jewish HapMap Project with Gil Atzmon, which has sought to demonstrate that features of Jewish history could be observed in the genomes of contemporary Jewish diaspora groups, such as proselytism in the Mediterranean Basin in the Classical Era followed by relative genetic isolation and endogamy during the subsequent 2,000 years.

He has also investigated  the genetics of Hispanic and Latino people, including Puerto Ricans, Dominicans, Ecuadorians and Mexicans who currently reside in New York City.
 
Ostrer has written two other books on genetics, Essentials of Medical Genomics (2002 with Stuart Brown and John Hay) and Non-Mendelian Genetics in Humans (1998).

Criticisms
Ostrer received criticism from Johns Hopkins University post-doc Eran Elhaik, who challenged the validity of Ostrer's past work on the topic of the origin of European Jews. Elhaik has criticized Ostrer's explanations for Jewish demographic history and Ostrer being unwilling to share his data with other researchers, "unless research includes novelty and strength of the proposal, non-overlap with current or planned activities, and non-defamatory nature toward the Jewish people."

Pediatrician Catherine DeAngelis said that the requirement that the research not defame Jews was "peculiar", and that "what he does is set himself up for criticism: Wait a minute. What’s this guy trying to hide?"
Behar et al. formulated a response to Elhaik's hypothesis. They contradicted Elhaik's hypothesis and called Elhaik's procedural assumption that the Armenians and Georgians of the South Caucasus region could serve as appropriate proxies for Khazar descendants "problematic" and "particularly poor," concluding their analysis as follows:We confirm the notion that the Ashkenazi, North African, and Sephardi Jews share substantial genetic ancestry and that they derive it from Middle Eastern and European populations, with no indication of a detectable Khazar contribution to their genetic origins.

In a 2015 overview of the issue of attempts to derive an inclusive genetic profile of all Jews, Raphael Falk, touching on Elhaik's contribution to the argument in 2013, wrote:
The findings support the hypothesis that posits that European Jews are  Caucasus, European, and Middle Eastern ancestries, and portray the European Jewish genome as a mosaic of Caucasus, European, and Semitic ancestries, thereby consolidating previous contradictory reports of Jewish ancestry.
Falk then noted the follow-up paper by Behar challenging Elhaik's results argued that the southern Caucasus populations, sampled by Elhaik were related to countries further south. The problem, he concluded, was that 'the risk of circularity of the argument is exposed: Geneticist determine the genotypic details of socio-ethnologists' classifications, whereas socio-demographers rely on geneticists findings to bolster their classifications.'

See also
 Race and genetics

References

Journal citations

2.	Mendelian Diseases Among Roman Jews: Implications for the Origins of Disease Alleles.  ‘’Journal of Clinical Endocrinology & Metabolism.’’ Vol. 84, No. 12 4405-4409 (1999).

3.	The carrier frequency of the BRCA2 6174delT mutation among Ashkenazi Jewish individuals is approximately 1%.  ‘’Nature Genetics.’’  14, 188 - 190 (1996).

4.	In DNA, New Clues to Jewish Roots.  Wade, Nicholas.  New York Times.  May 14, 2002.

5.	Gene Mutation Tied To Colon Cancers In Ashkenazi Jews.  Wade, Nicholas.  New York Times.  August 26, 1997.

6.	As Gene Test Menu Grows, Who Gets to Choose?.  Harmon, Amy.  New York Times.  July 21, 2004.

8.	Staying Alive, Staying Human. Kristof, Nicholas D.  New York Times.  February 11, 2003.

External links to Ostrer projects 
 Jewish Hapmap Project
 Genetics of Sex Determination

Living people
Year of birth missing (living people)
American geneticists
Jewish American scientists
Medical geneticists
University of Florida faculty
Massachusetts Institute of Technology School of Science alumni
Columbia University Vagelos College of Physicians and Surgeons alumni
Johns Hopkins University alumni
21st-century American Jews